Ignacy Krieger (born in 1817 or 1820 in the Mikołaj manor, Wadowice district (currently in the city of Wadowice); died on 17 June 1889, in Krakow) was a Polish photographer from Krakow. He was the owner of a photo studio documenting the city and its monuments.

Life and work
It is not known where and with whom he studied photography.

In 1860, after returning from a foreign trip, during which he improved his skills, he moved to Krakow and established a studio. It was located in the yard of A. Schwarz's house at ul. Grodzka 88 (currently 13). In May of the same year, in "Czas" he posted an advertisement saying that he was making portraits, medallions, group photos, "landscape views" and photos of buildings. As a photographer, he quickly gained a high position in the city. Approx. In 1864 he also had a branch of the plant in Tarnów.

After returning from a second trip abroad in 1865, the atelier moved to a tenement house at the corner of the Main Square and ul. st. Jana (then Rynek Główny 37, now 42).

He died in 1889 and was buried in the new Jewish cemetery in Krakow.

Technique 
Initially, Krieger used the collodion technique, which he replaced with bromo-gelatin after the mid-1880s. However, the wet collodion plate did not disappear completely from Krieger's factory and was used even after 1890 in reproduction photography.

References

External links 
 Photographs by Ignacy Krieger  in digital library Polona

Polish photographers
1889 deaths
Year of birth uncertain